George Frederick Samuel Robinson, 1st Marquess of Ripon,  (24 October 1827 – 9 July 1909), styled Viscount Goderich from 1833 to 1859 and known as the Earl of Ripon in 1859 and as the Earl de Grey and Ripon from 1859 to 1871, was a British politician and Viceroy and Governor General of India who served in every Liberal cabinet between 1861 and 1908.

Background and education
Ripon was born at 10 Downing Street, London, the second son of Prime Minister F. J. Robinson, 1st Viscount Goderich (who was created Earl of Ripon in 1833), by his wife Lady Sarah Hobart, daughter of Robert Hobart, 4th Earl of Buckinghamshire. He was educated privately, attending neither school nor college.

He was awarded the honorary degree of DCL by the University of Oxford in 1870.

Diplomatic and political career, 1852–1880
Ripon served on Sir Henry Ellis' British special mission to the Brussels Conference on the affairs of Italy in 1848–49. Although his father had been a Tory, Ripon was first a Whig and later a Liberal. He entered the House of Commons as one of the two members for Hull in 1852. Both he and his party colleague James Clay were unseated in 1853 by petition over claims of widespread corruption in their election, of which they were exonerated of any knowledge. He was returned for Huddersfield later in 1853 and for the West Riding of Yorkshire in 1857.

In 1859 he succeeded his father as second Earl of Ripon, taking his seat in the House of Lords, and later that year succeeded his uncle in the more senior title of Earl de Grey, becoming known as the Earl de Grey and Ripon. He was Under-Secretary of State for War under Lord Palmerston between 1859 and 1861 and again from 1861 to 1863,and briefly Under-Secretary of State for India in 1861. In 1863 he was made a Privy Counsellor and Secretary of State for War under Palmerston, with a seat in the Cabinet. He retained this office when Lord Russell became prime minister on Palmerston's death in 1865, and then served under Russell as Secretary of State for India between February and June 1866. In Gladstone's first administration he was Lord President of the Council (1868–1873). During this period he acted as chairman of the joint commission for drawing up the Treaty of Washington with the United States over the Alabama Claims. For this, in 1871 he was created Marquess of Ripon, in the County of York. He had already been made a Knight of the Order of the Garter in 1869. In 1878 he served as President of the first day of the Co-operative Congress.

Viceroy of India, 1880–1884

When Gladstone returned to power in 1880 he appointed Ripon Viceroy of India, an office he held until 1884. During his time in India, Ripon introduced legislation (the Ilbert Bill, named for the legal member of the Viceroy's Executive Council, Courtenay Ilbert) that would have granted native Indians more legal rights, including the right of Indian judges to judge Europeans in court. Though progressive in its intent, the legislation was scuppered by Europeans living in India who did not want to be tried by a native judge. In this Ripon was supported by Florence Nightingale, who also backed his efforts to obtain a Bengal land tenancy bill (eventually the Bengal Tenancy Act 1885) that would improve the situation of the peasants. In 1882 he repealed the controversial Vernacular Press Act of 1878 passed by Lytton. He also promoted the Indian Famine Codes.
 
He was also instrumental in supporting Dietrich Brandis to reorganize the Madras Forest Department and expand systematic forest conservancy in India. In 1883, Lord Ripon joined a shooting party organised by the Maharaja of Darbhanga which had a total bag of 1683, including 4 tigers, 47 buffaloes, 280 pigs and 467 deer. (The remainder was ″small game″.) There was some criticism at ″... such wholesale destruction, particularly as it happens to be the breeding season.″

He is still revered in Chennai (formerly Madras), India as "Lord Ripon engal appan" meaning: Lord Ripon, our father. The Corporation of Chennai's Ripon Building was named for him, as well as the town of Riponpet in the Shivamogga district in the state of Karnataka. In Calcutta, Ripon Street was named for him. The Ghanta Ghar Multan or Clock Tower of Multan in Pakistan was named Ripon Building and the hall of the same building was named Ripon Hall.. The Ripon Club in Mumbai (formerly Bombay) founded in 1884 by the Parsis for their community members, was named after him.

Political career, 1884–1908
Lord Ripon also became a supporter of Home Rule for Ireland. In Gladstone's 1886 government he was First Lord of the Admiralty, and in the government of 1892 to 1895 he was Secretary of State for the Colonies. When the Liberals again returned to power in 1905 under Sir Henry Campbell-Bannerman, he took office, aged 78, as Lord Privy Seal and Leader of the House of Lords. In 1908, he declined to remain as Lords leader when H. H. Asquith became Prime Minister in April, and he resigned as Lord Privy Seal in October.

As noted by Neil Smith, Ripon's liberalism had roots in the mid-nineteenth century, but his political views "shifted with the times". According to Smith, "he was greatly interested in labour questions, deeply sympathetic to labour aspirations and believed the state might interfere with wages and that the state had a duty to deal with unemployment".

Other appointments

Lord Ripon was President of the Royal Geographical Society during 1859–1860, and Trustee of the National Gallery. Lord Ripon also held many positions in public life in Yorkshire. In 1860, he was appointed honorary Colonel of the 1st Volunteer Battalion of the Prince of Wales' Own (West Yorkshire) Regiment, and was later awarded the Volunteer Decoration (VD); in 1863, he was High Steward of the borough of Hull, and from 1873 to 1906 he was Lord Lieutenant of the North Riding of Yorkshire. He was a deputy lieutenant and JP for the counties of Lincolnshire and the West Riding of Yorkshire, JP for the Liberty of Ripon, and served as Mayor of Ripon in 1895–1896.

Lord Ripon was a Freemason, who served as Provincial Grand Master of the West Riding and Deputy Grand Master of the United Grand Lodge of England from 1861 to 1869, and ultimately as Grand Master from 1870 until his conversion to Catholicism in 1874. His conversion to Catholicism was met by astonishment in the political world, and accusations of disloyalty.

Following his conversion he was generous in supporting Catholic educational and charitable works. He was president of the Society of St Vincent de Paul from 1899 until his death and a great supporter of St. Joseph's Catholic Missionary Society and St Wilfrid's Church in Ripon. He was also Chancellor of the University of Leeds from 1904 until his death in 1909.

Life
Lord Ripon married his cousin Henrietta Anne Theodosia Vyner, daughter of Henry Vyner and his wife Lady Mary Gertrude Robinson, daughter of Thomas Robinson, 2nd Earl de Grey, on 8 April 1851. They had one son and one daughter. Lady Ripon died in February 1907, aged 73. Lord Ripon survived her by two years and died of heart failure at Studley Royal Park in July 1909, aged 81. He was buried at St Mary's, Studley Royal and was succeeded by his only son, Frederick. His estate was assessed for probate with a value of £127,292. 15s. 8d. (equivalent to £ million in ).

References

External links
 
 

1827 births
1909 deaths
British Secretaries of State
Children of prime ministers of the United Kingdom
Companions of the Order of the Indian Empire
Converts to Roman Catholicism
Earls of Ripon
English Roman Catholics
Fellows of the Royal Society
First Lords of the Admiralty
Grand Masters of the United Grand Lodge of England
Knights Grand Commander of the Order of the Star of India
Knights of the Garter
Leaders of the House of Lords
Lord Presidents of the Council
Lord-Lieutenants of the North Riding of Yorkshire
Lords Privy Seal
1
Members of the Privy Council of the United Kingdom
People from Westminster
Presidents of Co-operative Congress
Presidents of the Royal Geographical Society
Secretaries of State for the Colonies
Viceroys of India
George
Robinson, George
Robinson, George
Ripon, M1
UK MPs who were granted peerages
Robinson, George
Peers of the United Kingdom created by Queen Victoria
People associated with the University of Leeds